The 34th PMPC Star Awards for Television honors the best in Philippine television programming from 2019 until 2020, 
as chosen by the Philippine Movie Press Club. The ceremony is held virtually on October 17, 2021 and to be broadcast on STV at 6:00 pm. The ceremony is hosted by Sanya Lopez and Alfred Vargas.

The nominations were announced by the Press on July 19, 2021.

Winners and Nominees

Winners are listed first and highlighted in bold:

Networks

Programs

Personalities

Special Awards

Ading Fernando Lifetime Achievement Award
Boy Abunda

Excellence in Broadcasting Lifetime Achievement Award
Korina Sanchez

German Moreno Power Tandem Award
Seth Fedelin and Andrea Brillantes

Most major nominations

Most major wins

Performers

References

See also 
PMPC Star Awards for TV
2020 in Philippine television

PMPC Star Awards for Television
2020 in Philippine television